Burdette may refer to:

 Burdette (name), a list of people with the given name or surname
 "Big Enos" and "Little Enos" Burdette, characters in the 1980 film Smokey and the Bandit II
 Burdette, a character on It's a Big Big World, an American children's television series
 Burdette, Arkansas, United States, a town
 Burdette, West Virginia, United States, an unincorporated community
 Burdette Building, Simpsonville, South Carolina, United States, on the National Register of Historic Places
 Burdette Park, Vanderburgh County, Indiana, United States, a municipal park

See also
 Burdett (disambiguation)